Bolbosoma is a genus of worms belonging to the family Polymorphidae.

The genus has cosmopolitan distribution.

Species

Species:

Bolbosoma australis 
Bolbosoma balaenae 
Bolbosoma brevicolle

References

Polymorphidae
Acanthocephala genera